Carrollton Township is one of fourteen townships in Carroll County, Indiana. As of the 2010 census, its population was 598 and it contained 244 housing units.

History
Carrollton Township was organized in 1835.

Geography

Unincorporated towns
 Sharon
 Wheeling

Adjacent townships
 Washington Township (north)
 Deer Creek Township, Cass County (northeast)
 Ervin Township, Howard County (east)
 Burlington Township (south)
 Jackson Township (west)
 Monroe Township (west)

Major highways
  Indiana State Road 18
  Indiana State Road 29
  Indiana State Road 218

References
 
 United States Census Bureau cartographic boundary files

External links

 Indiana Township Association
 United Township Association of Indiana

Townships in Carroll County, Indiana
Townships in Indiana